The Plaza de Toros de Murcia (also known as the Plaza de Toros de La Condomina) is a bullring in Murcia, Spain. As of June 2015, it is used for bull fighting. The stadium holds 15,000 people. It was built in 1887.

External links
 Official website 

Murcia
Buildings and structures in Murcia
Sports venues in the Region of Murcia